David MacDonald (born Darjeeling) was an author and Tibetologist. He was the British Trade Agent in Tibet for twenty years.

Publications 
 The Land of The Lama (1929)
 Touring in Sikkim and Tibet (1930)
 Twenty Years In Tibet (1932)

References 

British military personnel of the British expedition to Tibet
Tibetologists
1870 births
Year of death missing